Dicksboro is a Gaelic Athletic Association club located in Kilkenny City, Ireland.

History
Dicksboro GAA Club, founded in 1909.

The club takes its name from Dicksboro townland, located next to Kilkenny Airport, the current ground is Palmerstown, to the west of the city.

Dicksboro entered and won the junior championship of 1910.
Dicksboro entered the senior championship in 1911.
Dicksboro had no team from 1961 to 1969, until the club was reformed.
Dicksboro officially opened the grounds in Palmerstown in June 1990.

Honours

Hurling 
 Kilkenny Senior Hurling Championship Winners (5) 1923, 1926, 1950, 1993, 2017 Runners-Up 1915, 1925, 1928, 1937, 1994, 2012, 2020
 Leinster Senior Club Hurling Championship (0) Runners-Up 1993
 Kilkenny Intermediate Hurling Championship Winners (3) 1991, 2005, 2010 Runners-up 1976, 1977, 1981, 2009
 Leinster Intermediate Club Hurling Championship Winners (2) 2005, 2010
 All-Ireland Intermediate Club Hurling Championship Winners (1) 2006  Runners-Up 2011
 Kilkenny Junior Hurling Championship Winners (3) 1910, 1914, 1919
 Kilkenny Special Junior [A] Hurling Championship Winners (1) 1994
 Kilkenny Under-21 Hurling Championship Winners (5) 1986, 1991, 1992, 2008, 2009, 2014
 Kilkenny Under-21 North Hurling Championship Winners (6) 1986, 1991, 1992, 2005, 2008, 2009
 Kilkenny Under-21 Roinn "C" Hurling Championship Winners (1) 2001
 Kilkenny Under-19 Hurling Championship Winners (1) 2022
 Kilkenny Minor Hurling Championship Winners (12) 1951, 1952, 1953, 1969, 1973, 1990, 2006, 2009, 2010, 2015, 2019, 2020, 2022
 Kilkenny Minor C Hurling Championship Winners (1) 2007
 Kilkenny Under-16 Hurling Championship Winners (3) 2006, 2008, 2011
 Kilkenny Under-15 Hurling Championship  Winners (1) 2018, 2019, 2022
 Kilkenny Under-14 Hurling Championship Winners (8) 1991, 2001, 2004, 2005, 2006, 2007, 2009, 2012.
 Kilkenny Under-14 Hurling Féile (Paddy Grace Memorial Trophy) Winners (7) 2004, 2005, 2006, 2009, 2017, 2018,2019
 All-Ireland Féile na nGael Ronin A (2) 2009, 2017
 Kilkenny Senior Hurling League Winners (5) 1994, 1996, 2017, 2019, 2020
 Kilkenny Intermediate Hurling League Winners (1) 2005
 Aylward Cup Winners (1) 2005
 Kilkenny Minor Hurling League Winners (2) 1983, 2009
 Kilkenny Minor Hurling League Roinn 'C Winners (1) 2007
 Kilkenny Junior Hurling League Winners (1) 2008
 Kilkenny Under-16 Hurling League Winners (5) 1988, 2005, 2006, 2007, 2010
 Kilkenny Under-14 Hurling League Winners (4) 2005, 2006, 2009, 2012
 Byrne Cup Winners (4) 1998, 1999, 2000, 2008

Camogie 
 Kilkenny Senior [A] Camogie Championship 2019, 2021
 Kilkenny Intermediate [A] Camogie Championship 2011
 Kilkenny Junior [A] Camogie Championship 1991, 2009
 Kilkenny Under-21 [A] Camogie Championship 2015
 Kilkenny Under-18 Roinn 'A' Camogie Championship 2014, 2015
 Kilkenny Under-18 Roinn 'B' Camogie Championship 2007
 Kilkenny Under-18 Roinn 'C' Camogie Championship 2003, 2011, 2015
 Kilkenny Under-16 Roinn 'A' Camogie Championship 2009, 2010, 2015, 2019
 Kilkenny Under-14 Roinn 'A' Camogie Championship 2015, 2017, 2019
 Kilkenny Under-14 Roinn 'B' Camogie Championship 2008, 2013
 Feile Champions 'A'  2013
 Feile 'A' Shield Champions2019
 Kilkenny Junior League 2008, 2009

Football 
 Kilkenny Senior Football Championship 1994, 1997 (Runners-Up 1995, 2000)
 Kilkenny Intermediate Football Championship 1991
 Kilkenny Junior Football Championship 1990
 Kilkenny Special Junior Football Championship 1982, 1994
 Kilkenny Under-21 Football Champions 1985, 1989, 1990, 1991
 Kilkenny Minor Football Championship 1969, 1970, 1971, 1984, 1989, 2003
 Kilkenny Under-16 Football Championship 1982, 1988, 1989, 1994, 1995, 2007, 2011
 Kilkenny Under-14 Football Championship 1987, 1992, 1993, 1999, 2005, 2006, 2012
 Kilkenny Under-14 Football League Winners (2) 2005, 2006
 Kilkenny Under-16 Football League Winners (5) 1981, 1982, 1988, 1990, 1994

Famous Hurlers

*After moving to Dublin Matty Power played for the Dublin senior hurling team. He won his six county titles while playing with the Garda GAA club in Dublin.

*Paddy Grace won four county titles in a row while playing with Carrickshock.

See also 
 Kilkenny Senior Hurling Championship
 Kilkenny Senior Football Championship
 Leinster Intermediate Club Hurling Championship

References

Further reading

External links
 
 
 
 

Gaelic games clubs in County Kilkenny
Hurling clubs in County Kilkenny
Gaelic football clubs in County Kilkenny